Medvedgrad (Croatian for bear-town) is a medieval fortified town located on the south slopes of Medvednica mountain, approximately halfway from the Croatian capital Zagreb to the mountain top Sljeme. For defensive purposes it was built on a hill, Mali Plazur, that is a spur of the main ridge of the mountain that overlooks the city. On a clear day the castle can be seen from far away, especially the high main tower. Below the main tower of the castle is Oltar Domovine (Altar of the homeland) which is dedicated to Croatian soldiers killed in the Croatian War of Independence.

History
In 1242, Mongols invaded Zagreb. The city was destroyed and burned to the ground. This prompted the building of Medvedgrad. Encouraged by Pope Innocent IV, Philip Türje, bishop of Zagreb, built the fortress between 1249 and 1254. It was later owned by bans of Slavonia. Notable Hungarian poet and Ban of Slavonia Janus Pannonius (1472), and Ban of Croatia Ivan Karlović (1531), died in the Medvedgrad castle.

The last Medvedgrad owners and inhabitants was the Gregorijanec family, who gained possession of Medvedgrad in 1562. In 1574, the walls of Medvedgrad were reinforced, but after the 1590 Neulengbach earthquake, the fortress was heavily damaged and the owners relocated to Šestine. It was reduced to ruins, along with the Veliki Kalnik fortress in Križevci, by the 1699 Metlika earthquake.

Name
Medvedgrad in Croatian language is a combination of two words: "medved" (local kajkavian dialect for "medvjed") - bear, and "grad"  - town, making it translated as Bear Town.

References

Further reading

External links

 Medvedgrad on WikiMapia
 3D-model in Google Earth

Buildings and structures completed in 1254
Castles in Croatia
Buildings and structures in Zagreb
Ruined castles in Croatia
Tourist attractions in Zagreb